Eugenijus Nikolskis (24 November 1917 – 26 October 1992) was a Lithuanian basketball and table tennis player. He won two gold medals with the Lithuania national basketball team during EuroBasket 1937 and EuroBasket 1939.

Biography
During World War I his parents moved to Russian Empire where Nikolskis was born. In 1922 he returned to Lithuania and attended Kaunas Jėzuitai Gymnasium, which he graduated in 1936. He also served in the Lithuanian Army.

Nikolskis played table tennis and won Lithuania table tennis competition multiple times, been CJSO member. In 1939, in Cairo, he participated in table tennis world championship with Lithuania national team and finished 4th. From 1936 he also played basketball and was invited to Lithuania national basketball team two times. He played for Small forward position and became EuroBasket champion twice in EuroBasket 1937 and EuroBasket 1939.

Nikolskis worked at various Kaunas companies, after World War II he moved to Vilnius and there became "Spartakas" table tennis society coach. From 1953 he lived in Moscow, been Moscow "Spartakas" society head coach.

Nikolskis died in Moscow on 26 October 1992, at the age of 74.

References

Sources
 Jungtinių Amerikos Valstijų lietuviai. (II t.) – Mokslo ir enciklopedijų leidybos centras, Vilnius, 2002
 Vidas Mačiulis, Vytautas Gudelis. Halė, kurioje žaidė Lubinas ir Sabonis. 1939–1989 – Respublikinis sporto kombinatas, Kaunas, 1989

1917 births
1992 deaths
FIBA EuroBasket-winning players
Lithuanian men's basketball players
Sportspeople from Arkhangelsk
Small forwards
Soviet basketball coaches